West Brompton is a London Underground, London Overground and National Rail station on Old Brompton Road (A3218) in West Brompton, located in west London, and is on the District line and West London Line (WLL). It is immediately south of the demolished Earls Court Exhibition Centre and west of Brompton Cemetery in the Royal Borough of Kensington and Chelsea.

The station's location on the WLL forms a borough boundary and its tracks are shared between Kensington & Chelsea and the London Borough of Hammersmith and Fulham. Since 2000 it has been a Grade II (starting category) Listed Building.

History
The West London Extension Joint Railway (WLEJR) was opened in the early 1860s. It joined the southern end of the West London Joint Railway at Kensington (Olympia) station with Clapham Junction station and ran through West Brompton although a station was not opened until 1866. The original station was designed by the chief engineer of the Metropolitan and District Railway, Sir John Fowler and thus has local railway associations that go back to 1838. The current Lillie (road) bridge dates from 1860 and is the work of Fowler. The soon to disappear Lillie Bridge Railway and Engineering Depot, opened in 1872, is close by. Other historic associations are with the Lillie Bridge Grounds, a noted 19th c. athletics, cricket, ballooning and cycling venue adjacent to the West of the station and Brompton Cemetery adjacent to the East. From 1887, the station gave access to John Robinson Whitley's Earl's Court exhibition grounds and from 1937 to 2014 it was the alternative access to Earls Court Exhibition Centre, now demolished.

On 12 April 1869, the District Railway (DR, now the District line) opened its own station adjacent to the WLEJR station as the terminus and only station on its extension from  station (Earl's Court station did not open until 1871). The original plan was to connect the DR to the WLEJR but this did not take place.

In 1906 a heat wave affected the railway such that one of the Underground's electric rails was warped at the station; trains coasted over the affected track until it was repaired.

In 1940, during World War II, several WLL stations sustained bomb damage. The Underground station remained in use and the WLL continued in use for freight traffic. The WLL station buildings and platforms were subsequently demolished.

Full passenger services resumed on the WLL in 1994, but it was not until 1 June 1999 that new Network Rail platforms were opened at West Brompton by the then Minister of Transport, Glenda Jackson. There is a commemorative plaque to this effect on the Western lift tower. The station design was by Robinson Kenning and Gallagher of Croydon. The lift tower design is an echo of the decorative brickwork by the 19th c. City of London architect and surveyor, John Young designer of the nearby Empress Place and Lillie Road terrace in Fulham. The works were funded by the Royal Borough of Kensington and Chelsea and the London Borough of Hammersmith and Fulham on whose border the station lies.

The WLL platforms do not have a separate entrance and access is from the Underground station. The District line serves platforms 1 and 2 and the WLL serves platforms 3 and 4. There is a fence between platforms 2 and 3, but they are on the same level and it is possible to pass directly between them.

There are lifts to both overground platforms for wheelchair access, and this means there is also step-free access to the eastbound District line platform, but not the westbound one. The station is in a cutting that is covered at one end.

Services
Typical off-peak services per hour:

London Underground District line
 3 eastbound to 
 3 eastbound to Barking via Tower Hill
 6 eastbound to 
 12 westbound to 

London Overground
 4 southbound to Clapham Junction.

Southern

Some additional Southern services also operate between Shepherd's Bush and Clapham Junction.

On Sundays, Southern services only run between Watford Junction and Clapham Junction.

Image gallery

References

External links
 London Transport Museum Photographic Archive
 
 
 
London's Abandoned Tube stations – West London Line
West Brompton, SubBrit disused stations project

District line stations
Tube stations in the Royal Borough of Kensington and Chelsea
Railway stations in the Royal Borough of Kensington and Chelsea
Former West London Extension Railway stations
Railway stations in Great Britain opened in 1866
Railway stations in Great Britain closed in 1940
Railway stations in Great Britain opened in 1999
Reopened railway stations in Great Britain
Former Metropolitan District Railway stations
Railway stations in Great Britain opened in 1869
Railway stations served by London Overground
Railway stations served by Govia Thameslink Railway
Grade II listed buildings in the Royal Borough of Kensington and Chelsea
Station
1866 establishments in England
1940 disestablishments in England